Dendropsophus counani is a frog in the family Hylidae.  It is endemic to Brazil, French Guiana, Suriname, and Guyana.

The adult male frog measures 19.6 to 21.7 mm in snout-vent length and the adult female frog 22.1 to 24.5 mm. The tops of the thighs are dark grey with cream blotches and no yellow patches or stripes.

References

Amphibians described in 2015
Frogs of South America
counani